Harold Sawyer may refer to:

Harold S. Sawyer (1920–2003), American attorney and politician from Michigan
Harold E. Sawyer (1890–1969), American prelate

See also
Harry Sawyer (disambiguation)